Lectionary 325 (Gregory-Aland), designated by siglum ℓ 325 (in the Gregory-Aland numbering) is a Greek manuscript of the New Testament, on parchment. Palaeographically it has been assigned to the 13th century. The manuscript has not survived in complete condition.

Description 

The original codex contained lessons from the Gospel of Luke (Evangelistarium), on 90 parchment leaves. The leaves are measured. It contains Menologion on four folios. One folio was added in the 14th century.

The text is written in Greek minuscule letters, in two columns per page, 18 lines per page. It has musical notes.

History 

Scrivener and Gregory dated the manuscript to the 13th century. It has been assigned by the INTF to the 13th century.

It was purchased in 1862 from Henry Stanhope Freeman.

The manuscript was added to the list of New Testament manuscripts by Scrivener (273e) and Gregory (number 325e). Gregory saw it in 1883.

The codex is housed at the British Library (Add MS 22374) in London.

The fragment is not cited in critical editions of the Greek New Testament (UBS4, NA28).

See also 

 List of New Testament lectionaries
 Biblical manuscript
 Textual criticism
 Lectionary 326

Notes and references

Bibliography

External links 
 

Greek New Testament lectionaries
13th-century biblical manuscripts
British Library additional manuscripts